A software synthesizer or softsynth is a computer program that generates digital audio, usually for music. Computer software that can create sounds or music is not new, but advances in processing speed now allow softsynths to accomplish the same tasks that previously required the dedicated hardware of a conventional synthesizer. Softsynths may be readily interfaced with other music software such as music sequencers typically in the context of a digital audio workstation. Softsynths are usually less expensive and can be more portable than dedicated hardware.

Types

Softsynths can cover a range of synthesis methods, including subtractive synthesis (including analog modeling, a subtype), FM synthesis (including the similar phase distortion synthesis), physical modelling synthesis, additive synthesis (including the related resynthesis), and sample-based synthesis.

Many popular hardware synthesizers are no longer manufactured but have been emulated in software. The emulation can even extend to having graphics that model the exact placements of the original hardware controls. Some simulators can even import the original sound patches with accuracy that is nearly indistinguishable from the original synthesizer. Popular synthesizers such as the Moog Minimoog, Yamaha DX7, Korg M1, Sequential Prophet-5, Oberheim OB-X, Roland Jupiter 8, ARP 2600 and dozens of other classics have been recreated in software. Software Synth developers such as Arturia offer virtual editions of analog synths like the Minimoog, the ARP 2600, as well as the Yamaha CS-80. Gforce produces a Minimoog with sounds designed by Rick Wakeman and version of the ARP Odyssey.

Some softsynths are sample-based, and frequently have more capability than hardware units, since computers have fewer restrictions on memory than dedicated hardware synthesizers. Sample libraries may be many gigabytes in size. Some are specifically designed to mimic real-world instruments such as pianos. Sample libraries' formats include .wav, .sf or .sf2.

Often a composer or virtual conductor will want a "draft mode" for initial score editing and then use the "production mode" to generate high-quality sound as one gets closer to the final version. The draft mode allows for quicker turn-around, perhaps in real time, but will not have the full quality of the production mode. The draft render is roughly analogous to a wire-frame or "big polygon" animation when creating 3D animation or CGI. Both are based on the trade-off between quality and turn-around time for reviewing drafts and changes.

Software instrument

A software instrument can be a synthesized version of a real instrument (like the sounds of a violin or drums), or a unique instrument, generated by computer software. Software instruments have been made popular by the convergence of synthesizers and computers, as well as sequencing software like GarageBand, Logic Pro, and Ableton Live. Also of note is software like Csound and Nyquist, which can be used to program software instruments.

See also
 :Category:Software synthesizers
 :Category:Music software plugin architectures
 Digital audio editor
 Modular synthesizer
 Music sequencer
 Digital audio workstation
 Sound module
 Synthesizer
 SynthFont
 TiMidity++
 Video game music
 List of music software

References

Music software